Aung Ye Lin (born 19 June 1988) is a Burmese actor and model.

Early life and education
Aung Ye Lin was born on 19 June 1988 in Yangon, Myanmar. He is the youngest child among two siblings, having an older brother named Phyo Ye Lin. From 1995 to 1998, he attended Basic Education High School No. 2 Kamayut (St. Augustine), moving to Basic Education High School No. 3 Dagon for his  secondary education and higher education.

Career
In 2005, he joined John Lwin's model training. Since then, he took professional training in modelling and catwalk. He began his entertainment career as a runway model as part of the John Lwin's John International Modeling Agency with countless advertising shows and runways that had been walked on. In 2006, he joined the Snow White film production and studied acting. His hard work as a model and acting in commercials was noticed by the film industry and soon, film casting offers came rolling in.

He made his acting debut in 2010 with a leading role in the film Yay Thu Ma (The Mermaid), alongside Thinzar Wint Kyaw and Soe Pyae Thazin, directed by Kyi Phyu Shin.

Filmography

Film 
A Lann Zayar 2 (2013)
Thet Tan Thit (2014)
A Way Chit (2018)
Shal Chway Ma (2018)
Kiss Like Wine (2018)
My Country My Home (2018)
Mhar Tae Back Ka Nay Kyi Bar (2019)

References

Living people
21st-century Burmese male actors
People from Yangon
1988 births
Burmese male models
Burmese male film actors